Marie-Louis-Georges Colomb (Lure, Haute-Saône, 25 May 1856 – Nyons, 3 January 1945) was a French botanist, science populariser, and a pioneer of French comics, known as bandes dessinées .

Under the pseudonym Christophe (playing on "Christophe Colomb", the French name for Columbus), Colomb created comics that were popular among the French intelligentsia, yet were published in Le Petit Français illustré, a children's paper. His popular L'idée fixe du savant Cosinus (1893–1899) featured a brilliant, absent-minded scientist. His other comics included La Famille Fenouillard (probably the first French comic, 1889); Le Sapeur Camember (1890–1896); Les Malices de Plick et Plock (1893–1904); and Le Baron de Cramoisy (1899).

Colomb's works were comic sketches exploring the quirks of his title characters. Images to him were more vital than words in communicating with children (the dialogue and Colomb's editorial remarks were always outside the picture frame). His frames have been said to anticipate the "visual grammar" of movies and television.

Colomb retired as Deputy Director of the Sorbonne's botanical laboratory. 
Novelist Marcel Proust was a student of Colomb in his youth, and seems to have taken an interest in botany from him—Proust's À la recherche du temps perdu (In Search of Lost Time) presents botanical knowledge and speculation to such an extent that botany "constitutes an alternative lens through which the human world of the novel can be viewed."

Notes

References 

 Coward, David (2003). A history of French literature: from chanson de geste to cinéma. Wiley-Blackwell. .
 Luckhurst, Nicola (2000). Science and structure in Proust's À la recherche du temps perdu. Oxford modern languages and literature monographs. Oxford University Press. .

1856 births
1945 deaths
People from Lure, Haute-Saône
French comics artists
19th-century French botanists
Academic staff of the University of Paris
Lycée Condorcet teachers
20th-century French botanists